This is a list of Mar Thoma Syrian Christians.

Evangelists and saintly persons
 Abraham Malpan, pioneering cleric of the Malankara Syrian Church
 Iype Thoma Kathanar,  pioneer cleric, & father of rationalist Abraham Kovoor
 Sadhu Kochoonju Upadesi, preacher, poet and composer
 Philipose Mar Chrysostom, prelate and the emeritus Metropolitan of the Malankara Mar Thoma Syrian Church
 Easow Mar Timotheos Episcopa, episcopa (bishop) of the Mar Thoma Syrian Church
 Anchal Achan,  saint of Anchal
 Abraham Mar Thoma, head of the Malankara Mar Thoma Syrian Church from 1944–1949
 Juhanon Mar Thoma, head of the Malankara Mar Thoma Syrian Church from 1949–1976
 Alexander Mar Thoma, head of the Malankara Mar Thoma Syrian Church 
 Joseph Mar Thoma, XXIst Marthoma Metropolitan

Politics
 P. J. Kurien - former Deputy Chairman Rajya Sabha 
 Mathew T. Thomas - MLA (Tiruvalla)

 Thomas Chandy - MLA (Kuttanad), former Minister for Public Transport (Kerala Government)

 Madathilparampil Mammen Thomas - Governor of the Nagaland (from May 1990 to April 1992)
 T. M. Varghese - freedom fighter and statesman
 Thampan Thomas - MP of 8th Lok Sabha, Mavelikara Constituency
 Rosamma Punnoose - First Pre-term Speaker of the Kerala Assembly
 Titusji - the only Christian in a group of 78 marchers selected by Mahatma Gandhi to take part in the 1930 Dandi March, to break the salt law.
 George Joseph - Indian independence activist

Literature

 Kakkanadan, short story writer and novelist in the Malayalam language
 K. M. Tharakan, critic, novelist, litterateur and educationalist
 Meena Alexander,  poet, scholar, and writer
 Anna Sujatha Mathai, poet
 Sarah Thomas, Malayalam language writer
 Kuzhivelil Mathew, biblical scholar

Arts and media
 John Abraham (director) - Malayalam Director
 Blessy - Film Director
 John Abraham (actor) - Actor (Bollywood)
 Meera Jasmine - National Award Winning Actress
 Joy Mathew - Actor
 Kailash, Film actor
 Sandra Thomas - Film producer and actress
 John Matthew Matthan - Director of Bollywood movie, Sarfarosh
 Deepa Mariam - Singer

Science, humanities, sports, and public service
 K. T. Thomas (Justice) - Justice of the Supreme Court of India (1996–2002) 

 T. K. Oommen - Economist
 Pothan Joseph - Journalist
 Sunnykutty Abraham - Journalist
 Sunny Varkey - Entrepreneur
 Perakath Verghese Benjamin - Indian physician and medical writer, Padma awardee, expert in tuberculosis treatment in India
 M. O. Mathai - Private Secretary to India's first Prime Minister, Jawaharlal Nehru, popularly called as 'MAC' in political circles of that period
 Benjamin Pulimood - Director/Principal of the Christian Medical College & Hospital, Vellore, Tamil Nadu, India
 George Joseph - Scientist 
 Thomas Philipose - Only Mahavir Chakra holder from Kerala.

Marthoma Syrians by birth but stalwarts in other denominations
 P. C. John - Evangelist Kerala Brethren Church
 Poykayil Johannan - was a Dalit activist, poet and founder of Prathyaksha Raksha Daiva Sabha or PRDS
 Abraham Kovoor - Indian professor and rationalist, Founder of "Yukthi Vadhi Sangam"
 K. V. Simon - Notable Malayalam Christian poet from Kerala and prominent leader of the Kerala Brethren movement.
 K. P. Yohannan - founder and president of Gospel for Asia and Metropolitan Bishop of Believers Church

Indian Christians
Saint Thomas Christians